Stokes Mountain is the highest mountain of the Stokes Range and of Bathurst Island, Nunavut, Canada.

References

Arctic Cordillera
Mountains of Canada under 1000 metres